Lepetodrilus elevatus  is a species of small, deep-sea sea snail, a hydrothermal vent limpet, a marine gastropod mollusk in the family Lepetodrilidae.

Description

Distribution
This species occurs in hydrothermal vents and seeps of the East Pacific Rise.

References

 Warén A. & Bouchet P. (2001). Gastropoda and Monoplacophora from hydrothermal vents and seeps new taxa and records. The Veliger, 44(2): 116–231

External links
  Stephen Hunt, Structure and Composition of the Shell of the Archaeogastropod Limpet Lepetodrilus elevatus elevatus (Mclean 1988), Malacologia 1992 34 (1–2): 129–141

Lepetodrilidae
Gastropods described in 1988